The Marbella Parapente Paramotor PAP is a family of Spanish paramotors that was designed by Pierre Aubert and produced by Marbella Parapente of Málaga for powered paragliding. Now out of production, when it was available the aircraft was supplied complete and ready-to-fly.

Production seems to have ended in March 2005 when the company went out of business.

Design and development
The PAP series was designed to comply with the US FAR 103 Ultralight Vehicles rules as well as European regulations. It features a paraglider-style wing, single-place or two-place-in-tandem accommodation and a single engine in pusher configuration with a reduction drive and a two-bladed wooden propeller. The engines, drive and propeller varies by model. The PAP series was noted for attention to detail and in particular for having the reserve parachute built into the frame structure. The cage structure can be broken down into two, three or four sections for ground transport.

As is the case with all paramotors, take-off and landing is accomplished by foot. Inflight steering is accomplished via handles that actuate the canopy brakes, creating roll and yaw.

Operational history
PAP series paramotors were flown to first place in the world championships in 2001, 2002, 2003 and 2004.

Pilot Ramon Morillas set a world record in June 1998, flying a PAP across Spain from southwest to northeast for a distance of  covered in about 11:30.

Variants
PAP 1100 CD
Model with a  Cors'Air M21Y engine in pusher configuration with a 2.2:1 ratio reduction drive and a  diameter two-bladed wooden propeller.
PAP 1100 TD
Model with a  Per Il Volo Top 80 engine in pusher configuration with a 3.38:1 ratio reduction drive and a  diameter two-bladed wooden propeller.
PAP 1300 CD
Model with a  Cors'Air M21Y engine in pusher configuration with a 2.6:1 ratio reduction drive and a  diameter two-bladed wooden propeller.
PAP 1300 TD
Model with a  Per Il Volo Top 80 engine in pusher configuration with a 3.60:1 ratio reduction drive and a  diameter two-bladed wooden propeller.
PAP 1400 CD
Model with a  Cors'Air M21Y engine in pusher configuration with a 2.6:1 ratio reduction drive and a  diameter two-bladed wooden propeller.
PAP 1400 TD
Model with a  Per Il Volo Top 80 engine in pusher configuration with a 3.60:1 ratio reduction drive and a  diameter two-bladed wooden propeller.

Specifications (PAP 1100 CD)

References

PAP
2000s Spanish ultralight aircraft
Single-engined pusher aircraft
Paramotors